Neville Thomas Dowen (18 August 1901 – 25 October 1964) was an English cricketer.  Dowen was a left-handed batsman who bowled right-arm fast-medium.  He was born at Bulwell, Nottinghamshire.

Dowen made his first-class debut for Leicestershire against Northamptonshire in the 1925 County Championship.  He played three further first-class matches in that seasons County Championship.  Dowen next appeared in first-class cricket for Leicestershire in the 1935 County Championship against Yorkshire, before making two further first-class appearances for the county, one in the 1936 County Championship against Northamptonshire, and against the touring Australians in 1938.  In his seven first-class appearances, he scored a total of 187 runs at an average of 15.58, with a high score of 44.

He died at Evington, Leicestershire, on 25 October 1964.

References

External links

1901 births
1964 deaths
People from Bulwell
Cricketers from Nottinghamshire
English cricketers
Leicestershire cricketers